My Bromance: The Series (Thai title: "My Bromance ", My Bromance: Phi Chai The Series) is a 2016 Thai LGBT drama produced by MCOT. This series features Chaiya Jirapirom and Patpasit Songkla. It was filmed primarily in Thailand.

The series is based on the earlier successful 2014 film My Bromance.

The new series' season 1 will run 12 episodes, with new casts and new storyline, including several flashbacks to 8 years ago. All episodes air every Sunday on MCOT.

Greatest Entertainment has confirmed that the season 2 is coming soon.

Plot
Based on the successful movie, Golf's and Bank's homophobic father/stepfather, sends Bank to the US to study, while a devastated Golf stays in Bangkok, Thailand, after knowing their relationship. However 8 years later, Bank and Golf returns home from their respective trips (Bank was in Los Angeles working on a project as a researcher), and (Golf returns from a working trip in Pulau Weh, Indonesia as an experienced diver). Unbeknownst to Golf, is that Bank is attached to his overseas boyfriend (Jackson) of 2 years. Who will Bank choose, Golf, a lover/brother for more than 8 years or his soon to be husband (Jackson) of 2 years.

Cast
To be updated as more information is revealed and when the shows airs on Channel 9.

Episodic Synopsis

Soundtrack/OST
Here are the songs in this drama:

 "ครั้งแรก (Krung Raek)” by Bass Hello Icons – Opening theme song
 “ฝาก (Fahk)” by Bass Hello Icons – End credit theme song

References

Thai television soap operas
Thai boys' love television series
2016 Thai television series debuts
2017 Thai television series endings
Television series by Greatest Entertainment
MCOT HD original programming
2010s LGBT-related drama television series